Maria Apostolidi (born ) was a Greek female artistic gymnast, and represented her nation at international competitions.  

She participated at the 2004 Summer Olympics, and at the 2003 World Artistic Gymnastics Championships.

References

External links
Maria Apostolidi at Sports Reference
https://www.olympic.org/news/artistic-gymnasts-compete-in-olympic-indoor-hall
http://www.gymmedia.com/artistic-gymnastics/Comeback-Ioannis-Melissanidis-starts-again-after-break-18-Month
https://www.youtube.com/watch?v=4aYLkConIaE

1988 births
Living people
Greek female artistic gymnasts
Gymnasts at the 2004 Summer Olympics
Olympic gymnasts of Greece